Air Indiana was a regional, charter and cargo airline that operated Douglas DC-3 aircraft during the late 1970s.

In December 1977, Air Indiana Flight 216, a DC-3 registered N51071 carrying the University of Evansville basketball team, crashed after takeoff at Evansville Regional Airport, killing the coach (Robert L. Watson) 29 passengers, team players and crew.

Destinations
Air Indiana served the following scheduled destinations as of 1979:

Danville, Illinois
Indianapolis, Indiana
Mattoon, Illinois
St. Louis, Missouri

See also
 List of defunct airlines of the United States

References
4. Coach Robert L. Watson was originally from Bethel Park, PA, a Pittsburgh, PA suburb.  Coach Watson was a graduate of Bethel Park, PA High School, and a graduate of VMI.  Bob served in Vietnam in 1965 - 66 and again in 1967 - 68.  He was highly decorated with many military honors, to include the Bronze Star, Silver Star and Purple Heart.

Defunct airlines of the United States
Airlines based in Illinois